The 1970 New York Yankees season was the 68th season for the franchise. The team finished in second place in the American League East with a record of 93–69, 15 games behind the Baltimore Orioles. The 93 wins were the most for the Yankees since 1964. New York was managed by Ralph Houk. The Yankees played their home games at Yankee Stadium.

Offseason 
 December 1, 1969: Tom Shopay was drafted from the Yankees by the Baltimore Orioles in the 1969 rule 5 draft.
 December 4, 1969: Joe Pepitone was traded by the Yankees to the Houston Astros for Curt Blefary.
 December 5, 1969: Al Downing and Frank Fernández were traded by the Yankees to the Oakland Athletics for Danny Cater and Ossie Chavarria.
 December 18, 1969: Mickey Scott and cash were traded by the Yankees to the Chicago White Sox for Pete Ward.

Regular season 
The Yankees went from a record of 80 wins and 81 losses in 1969 to a record of 93 wins and 69 losses.

Season standings

Record vs. opponents

Opening Day lineup 
 Horace Clarke 2B
 Thurman Munson C
 Roy White LF
 John Ellis 1B
 Danny Cater 3B
 Bobby Murcer CF
 Curt Blefary RF
 Gene Michael SS
 Mel Stottlemyre P

Notable transactions 
 September 22, 1970: Bobby Cox was released by the Yankees.

Roster

Player stats

Batting

Starters by position 
Note: Pos = Position; G = Games played; AB = At bats; R = Runs scored; H = Hits; Avg. = Batting average; HR = Home runs; RBI = Runs batted in; SB = Stolen bases

Other batters 
Note: G = Games played; AB = At bats; R = Runs scored; H = Hits; Avg. = Batting average; HR = Home runs; RBI = Runs batted in; SB = Stolen bases

Pitching

Starting pitchers 
Note: G = Games pitched; IP = Innings pitched; W = Wins; L = Losses; ERA = Earned run average; SO = Strikeouts

Other pitchers 
Note: G = Games pitched; IP = Innings pitched; W = Wins; L = Losses; ERA = Earned run average; SO = Strikeouts

Relief pitchers 
Note: G = Games pitched; W = Wins; L = Losses; SV = Saves; ERA = Earned run average; SO = Strikeouts

Awards and honors 
 Ralph Houk, Associated Press AL Manager of the Year
 1970 MLB All-Star Game
 Fritz Peterson, reserve
 Mel Stottlemyre, reserve
 Roy White, reserve

Farm system 

LEAGUE CHAMPIONS: Syracuse

Notes

References 
1970 New York Yankees at Baseball Reference
1970 New York Yankees team page at www.baseball-almanac.com

New York Yankees seasons
New York Yankees
New York Yankees
1970s in the Bronx